Andrew Cooper (born 24 February 1981) is an English actor and model.

Career 
Cooper appeared in an advertisement for Diet Coke in 2013. He has appeared in advertisements for several well known brands including Dunhill, Topman, Georgio Armani, and Paul Smith. Cooper made a move into acting and costarred on the television show The Royals.

He appeared in a Hallmark Channel television movie called Royal Hearts in 2018, opposite Cindy Busby and James Brolin.

Personal life 
He is married to Jane Cooper. They have 2 children, daughter Taylor (born 2009) and Jackson (born 2010). The couple own a pet store called The Mutz Nutz, a store that is at the heart of the community and aims to work with the various local charities in re-homing unwanted animals.

In 2016, he launched a cookbook called Juice Manifesto featuring more than 100 recipes for nutritious juices and smoothies.

Filmography

References

External links 
 

Living people
1981 births
British male film actors
British male models